Eraser is an open-source secure file erasure tool available for the Windows operating system. It supports both file and volume wiping.

Eraser securely erases data by overwriting it such that the data is irrecoverable. It supports a variety of data destruction standards, including British HMG IS5 (Infosec Standard 5), American DoD 5220.22-M, and the Gutmann method which features a 35-pass overwrite.

The tool has been recommended in TechAdvisor, The Guardian, and PC World, and is a tool suggested by the United States government Computer Emergency Readiness Team.

See also
 BleachBit
 CCleaner
 Data erasure
 Shred (Unix)

References

External links
 Official website
 Documentation

Data erasure software
2003 software
Utilities for Windows